Krishnan Thoothu also known as Sri Krishnan Thoothu was a film produced by S. M. Letchumanan Chettiyar and Rajagopal Talkies in the year 1940. The film was directed by R. Prakash. This film was known famously since this was the debut Tamil film of Telugu actress P. Kannamba.A short comedy film titled Kozhukattai Kuppu was also screened along with the main film,

Plot
The story of the film was of the history of Lord Krishna undertaking the mission of getting justice for the Pandavas from the Kaurava King Duryodhana. Serukulathur Sama played the main role of Lord Krishna. The debut actress P. Kannamba played the heroine role. Both N. S. Krishnan and T. A. Mathuram contributed to the short film with their comedies.

Cast
Cast adapted from the database of Film News Anandan and the film's songbook

Male Cast
 Serukulathur Sama as Krishnan
 Visalur Subramania Bhagavathar as Duryodhanan
 Nagainallur Lakshminarayana Bhagavathar as Vidhurar
 Sandow Natesa Pillai as Karnan
 D. Bala Subramanyam as Balaramar
 S. S. Mani Bhagavathar as Dharmar
 Battling. C. S. Dhan Singh as Bhiman
 R. S. Ramaswami Iyengar as Arjunan
 K. V. Krishnan as Nagulan
 Kothamangalam Ramasami as Sahadevan
 M. R. Durairaj as Sadhaki
 M. A. Ganapathi Bhat as Aswathama
 M. S. Velayutham as Devendran

Male cast (continued)
 T. Gopal Rao as Viradarajan
 L. Narayana Somayajalu as Sanjayar
 C. Chinaiah as Dhritharashtran
 K. S. A. Sami as Bhishmar
 M. Thiruvenkatam as Dushasanan
 K. Devanarayanan as Vikarnan 
 T. M. Babu as Durvasar
 P. G. Venkatesan as Naradar
 N. S. Krishnan! (Kozhukattai Kuppu)
 Comedian Jolly Kittu Iyer as Sakuni
 Comedian E. Krishnamoorthi as Kandhan
 Comedian Kunchithapadam Pillai as Rangan

Female cast
 Gruhalakshmi Star P. Kannamba as Draupadi
 M. R. Vasuvambal as Kunti Devi
 M. N. Vijayal as Sathyabhama
 T. S. Krishnaveni as Rukmani
 T. A. Mathuram! (Kozhukattai Kuppu)
 M. K. Babuji as Young Kunti
 Dhanabhagyam, Janaki Bai as Dancers
 Baby Ranga & Sulochana as Baby Dancers
Female support cast
 M. R. Kanakarathnam, M. R. Ramalakshmi, Pushpammal, Rajeevi, Pattu, Sulochana, Lakshmikantham, Shankari, Padmavathi.

Songs
No music director was credited, but the lyrics were written by Papanasam Sivan and Rajagopala Iyer. The songs were recorded by Jyotish Sinha.

Box office
The film though well directed by R. Prakash, the drawback was with the debut heroine P. Kannamba's poor Tamil accent. She didn't know Tamil and spoke it with a Telugu slang, which didn't go well with the Tamil audiences.

References

External links

1940 films
1940s Tamil-language films